M. Idris Ali is a Bangladesh Awami League politician and the incumbent Member of Parliament of Munshiganj-3.

Early life
Ali was born on 10 January 1945.

Career
Ali was elected to parliament from Munshiganj-3 as a Bangladesh Awami League candidate on 30 December 2008.

References

Awami League politicians
Living people
9th Jatiya Sangsad members
1945 births